Lois Cleveland Chiles (born April 15, 1947) is an American actress and former fashion model known for her role as Holly Goodhead in the James Bond film Moonraker (1979), and as a hit-and-run driver in 1987's Creepshow 2, as well as parts in The Great Gatsby, The Way We Were, Death on the Nile, Broadcast News, and as Holly Harwood in the television series Dallas.

Early life
Chiles was born in Houston, the daughter of Marion Clay Chiles and Barbara Wayne Kirkland Chiles. Her paternal uncle was oil tycoon and Texas Rangers owner Eddie Chiles. She had two brothers: Clay Kirkland Chiles (died 1979), and William Edmonds Chiles, president and CEO of Bristow Group, Inc. She was raised in Alice, Texas.

Chiles studied at the University of Texas at Austin and the former Finch College in New York City, where she was discovered by a Glamour editor looking for a young woman to feature on the cover of the magazine's annual college issue. She landed the job and soon had contracts with Wilhelmina Models in New York and Elite Models in Paris. Later, she studied acting under Roy London. She dated Don Henley but the relationship ended, and in 2005, she married money manager Richard Gilder. They are both honorary co-chairs of Northfield Mount Hermon, a school in Massachusetts. Gilder donated money to the school and they named the Chiles Theater after her.  Gilder died in 2020.

Career
In the early 1970s, Chiles enjoyed a successful modeling career. She made her big-screen debut in the 1972 blaxploitation film Together for Days, followed by 1973's The Way We Were, in which she played opposite Robert Redford and Barbra Streisand, as Carol Ann, the college sweetheart of Redford's character. She was then cast as Jordan Baker in 1974's The Great Gatsby, alongside Mia Farrow and, again, Robert Redford.

In 1978, she appeared, again with Farrow, in the film adaptation of Agatha Christie's Death on the Nile as Linnet Ridgeway Doyle, and in 1979, she appeared as NASA astronaut, scientist and Bond girl Dr. Holly Goodhead opposite Roger Moore's James Bond in Moonraker. Chiles had initially been approached to star in the previous Bond film The Spy Who Loved Me, but she declined the role as she was taking a break from acting at the time. She also appeared in a small role in the thriller Coma (1978), one of the many films in which she played a murder victim.

Chiles lost her youngest brother to non-Hodgkin's lymphoma in 1979, which contributed to her decision to take a three-year hiatus from acting just as her career seemed to be blossoming. Her film career never fully recovered, and she struggled to find roles of the caliber she had previously enjoyed, although film critic Pauline Kael gave her good notices for her performances in Alan Alda's Sweet Liberty (1986). Her portrayal of reporter Jennifer Mack in James L. Brooks' Broadcast News (1987) was also well received, as was her turn in George A. Romero's horror flick Creepshow 2 in 1987, as a hit-and-run driver. In 1989, she appeared uncredited in a short but effective cameo as the  estranged mother of Ione Skye's character in Say Anything... (1989).

She has since appeared as a stuffy high-school principal in the 1996 Disney film Wish Upon a Star, and as a frightened cruise passenger in the critically panned Speed 2: Cruise Control in 1997. She made a cameo appearance in the international release of the 1997 Bond spoof Austin Powers: International Man of Mystery, though her scene was cut from the United States release.

She has worked in television, playing J.R. Ewing's love interest Holly Harwood in the 1982–1983 season of Dallas and guest appearances in series such as Hart to Hart (as a psychotic split-personality model), In the Heat of the Night, Murder, She Wrote, and The Nanny (with another Bond girl, Ivana Miličević). Later career high points included the indie films Diary of a Hitman (1991) and Curdled (1996). In 2005, friend Quentin Tarantino, with whom she had previously worked on the set of Curdled, recruited her to appear in the two-episode finale of season five of CSI: Crime Scene Investigation, which he wrote and directed.

In the spring of 2002, she taught a course in film acting at the University of Houston. Unlike some "Bond girls", Chiles has said that "being a Bond girl is a fun way to be remembered", although she jokes that being asked to sigh "Oh, James" is as annoying as "you can't live up to people's fantasies".

Filmography

References

External links
 
 
 Interview with Lois Chiles focusing on her role on "Dallas"

1947 births
Living people
Actresses from Houston
Female models from Texas
American film actresses
American television actresses
People from Alice, Texas
University of Houston faculty
University of Texas at Austin alumni
20th-century American actresses
21st-century American actresses
American women academics